L41 may refer to:
 60S ribosomal protein L41, a human protein
 , a destroyer of the Royal Navy
 , an amphibious transport dock of the Indian Navy
 Lectionary 41
 Marble Canyon Airport, in Coconino County, Arizona
 Mitochondrial ribosomal protein L41, a human protein